The women's 57 kg judo competition at the 2012 Summer Paralympics was held on 31 August at ExCeL London.

Results

Repechage

References

External links
 

W57
Judo at the Summer Paralympics Women's Lightweight
Paralympics W57